Leonid Oleinicenco (born 14 December 1981) is a football administrator and Member of UEFA . He was elected President of the Football Association of Moldova in 2019, succeeding Pavel Cebanu.

Background 
He started his career in 2009 with the Moldovan federation as a finance director till 2015 and later was executive officer in 2015. In that year he enrolled at the  University of Lausanne management study course after working for more than ten years.

His predecessor, Pavel Cebanu, was the president of FAM from 1997 until his retirement in 2019.

Notes 

People from Moldova Nouă
1980 births
Living people